Cynara humilis, called wild thistle, is a species of flowering plant in the artichoke and cardoon genus Cynara native to the Canary Islands, Morocco, Algeria, Portugal, and Spain. It is used locally as a coagulant in artisanal sheep and goat cheesemaking.

References

Cynareae
Plants described in 1753